Sunset Murder Case is a 1938 American film directed by Louis J. Gasnier and starring Sally Rand and Esther Muir.

The film is also known as High Explosive in the United Kingdom.

Plot summary 
After her policeman father is killed  and nightclub singer Nina is murdered, Kathy posing as stripper Valarie goes to work underground to catch the gangster.  Her boyfriend reporter Lou watches out for her.

Cast 
Sally Rand as Kathy O'Connor - Peacock nightclub dance act - "Valarie"
Henry King as Master of Ceremonies
Esther Muir as Lora Wynne 
Lona Andre as Nita Madera - Murder victim
Vince Barnett as Martin - Henchman
Kathryn Kane as Penny Nichols - Nightclub act - singer
Dennis Moore as Lou Fleming - Reporter
Reed Hadley as Oliver Helton
Paul Sutton as Bapti Stephani
Stanley Price as Eric Martin - Henchman
Frank O'Connor as Detective Sergeant Tom O'Connor
Mary Brodel as Jane Baird
George Douglas as Carlo Rossmore
Bruce Mitchell as Everett
Lester Dorr as Editor
Eddie Gordon as Rankin
Monte Carter as Staufer
Bill Duray as Intern

Release
The film was made in 1938 but not released until 1941 due to censors. The name was changed from "Sunset Strip" to "Sunset Murder".  The studio Grand National went out of business and the order of the cast in the credits was changed as well.

Soundtrack 
"I'd Rather Look at You" (Written by Sam Coslow)

External links 

1938 films
1938 crime drama films
American mystery drama films
American black-and-white films
Grand National Films films
American crime drama films
1930s mystery drama films
Films directed by Louis J. Gasnier
1930s English-language films
1930s American films